Nsofwa Petronella Sampa is a Zambian HIV activist and clinical psychological counselor. Sampa's work focuses on working with people living with HIV and disabilities. She is a recipient of a Mandela Washington Fellowship, YALI participant and a PEPFAR beneficiary. After discovering her health status as being HIV positive, Sampa began to advocate for persons living with HIV/AIDS.

Early life and education 

Sampa was born in Zambia, a country which has a generalized HIV epidemic. Her father died in 1994 when she was 2 years old and her mother died in 2002 when Sampa was only 10 years old. Sampa's uncle then became her guardian, and she moved to his house. Sampa took medication everyday without knowing why she was taking it or what it was for, or why her cousins living in the same house did not do the same, as the family did not discuss it. In 2002, she had stumbled upon her medical file that revealed life changing information stating that she was HIV positive, but did not ask any questions.

Sampa attended Mary Queen of Peace for her primary education and later was enrolled in a boarding school for her secondary education. Whilst in boarding school, a peer discovered that Nsofwa was on ARV treatment. Soon the entire school was alerted, and Sampa found herself stigmatised, and sleeping alone as other students would not share a dormitory with her. She became very depressed, and she discarded her medication. Her health deteriorated  drastically, and she had to leave school. She developed opportunistic infections including tuberculosis and meningitis, as a result of which she became blind and deaf in one ear. Her aunt had engaged an HIV/AIDS specialist, Mannasseh Phiri, to counsel Sampa, and it was from him that she learned that her mother had died due to HIV/AIDS related illness, and that she herself had contracted the virus at birth. After recovering, Sampa attended Munali High School, which offered education for the visually impaired, and learned braille at the Zambia Library for the Visually Impaired. She then studied clinical and psychosocial counselling at Chainama College of Health Sciences in 2013, so that she could work with people living with HIV and disabilities.

Career 
Sampa is an HIV activist and clinical psychological counselor. She works with HIV-positive people to improve their status, live positively, and encourage families to discuss health issues with children. She assists those with HIV to follow treatment regimens. , Sampa is working on the Positive Movement project to empower people with disabilities, especially the blind.

Awards and honours 
In 2014, she was a beneficiary of the President's Emergency Plan for AIDS Relief. In 2017, she won a Mandela Washington Fellowship from the Young African Leaders Initiative which enabled her to undertake training in civic leadership in the US.

References

Living people
Zambian activists
Zambian women activists
HIV/AIDS activists
21st-century Zambian women
Year of birth missing (living people)
People with HIV/AIDS
People from Lusaka
Mental health professionals
Blind activists